The Lawrence Franklin espionage scandal involved Lawrence Franklin passing classified documents regarding United States policy towards Iran to Israel. Franklin, a former United States Department of Defense employee, pleaded guilty to several espionage-related charges and was sentenced in January 2006 to nearly 13 years of prison, which was later reduced to ten months' house arrest. Franklin passed information to American Israel Public Affairs Committee policy director Steven Rosen and AIPAC senior Iran analyst Keith Weissman, who were fired by AIPAC. They were then indicted for illegally conspiring to gather and disclose classified national security information to Israel. However, prosecutors later dropped all charges against them without any plea bargain.

On June 11, prosecutors asked Judge T. S. Ellis III to reduce Franklin's sentence to eight years for his cooperation. Judge Ellis said the dropping of the case against Rosen and Weissman was a "significant" factor in the sentencing of Franklin and sentenced him to ten months' house arrest along with 100 hours of community service. Ellis said Franklin's community service should consist of "speaking to young people about the importance of public officials obeying the law".

Background
On August 27, 2004, CBS News broke a story about a Federal Bureau of Investigation (FBI) investigation into a possible spy in the U.S. Department of Defense working for Israel. The story reported that the FBI had uncovered a spy working as a policy analyst under Under Secretary of Defense for Policy Douglas Feith and then-Deputy Secretary of Defense Paul Wolfowitz. He was later identified as Lawrence Franklin, who had previously served as an attaché at the U.S. embassy in Israel and was one of two mid-level Pentagon officials in the Office of the Secretary of Defense responsible for Iran policy in the office's Northern Gulf directorate.

Franklin has pleaded guilty to passing on oral information about a classified presidential directive, and other sensitive information pertaining to U.S. deliberations on foreign policy regarding Iran to AIPAC, who in turn provided the information to Israel. FBI sources have indicated that the year-long investigation was actively underway when the CBS News story broke. Franklin never passed any documents to AIPAC, only oral information.

According to FBI surveillance tapes, in 2003 Franklin relayed top-secret information orally to Rosen and Keith Weissman, a senior Iran analyst with AIPAC, while at the Tivoli Restaurant in Arlington, Virginia. On 27 August, the FBI raided Rosen's office, copying his personal computer's hard drive.

According to The New York Times, Lawrence Franklin was one of two U.S. officials who held meetings with Iranian dissidents, including Paris-based arms dealer Manucher Ghorbanifar, a key figure in the Iran–Contra affair. These Pentagon-approved meetings were brokered by neoconservative Michael Ledeen of the American Enterprise Institute, who had also played a part in Iran-Contra, and is said to have taken place in Paris in June 2003. The Jerusalem Post reported that the purpose of the meetings was to "undermine a pending deal that the White House had been negotiating with the Iranian government", specifically, an exchange of high-ranking al-Qaeda members in Iranian custody in return for a stop to U.S. support of the anti-Iranian Mujahideen al-Khalq fighters in Iraq. The Jerusalem Post article dated the beginning of the FBI investigation to this secret meeting, which the public first learned about in August 2003.

Franklin had previously been assigned to a unit tasked with the Pentagon's Iraq policy, raising concern that he might have been used to influence the war on Iraq, although Pentagon officials have maintained that he was in no position to influence policy. (See also Office of Special Plans.)

On August 30, 2004, Israeli officials admitted that Franklin had met repeatedly with Naor Gilon, head of the political department at the Israeli Embassy in Washington and a specialist on Iran's nuclear programs, but point out that this was completely appropriate activity for the two Iran specialists. A Newsweek report indicates that Gilon was under FBI surveillance and that Franklin only became a target after these meetings.

It has been suggested that Franklin's motivations may have been ideological or personal, rather than financial. An unnamed U.S. intelligence official told Newsweek: "for whatever reason, the guy hates Iran [the Iranian government] passionately."

Franklin's security clearance was revoked, although he was not fired, merely demoted. The FBI investigation continued until May 5 when he was arrested and charged with giving away top-secret information.

The indictment revealed that the investigation had been going on since 1999, and suggested that other individuals at AIPAC, the Defense Department and the Israeli embassy had been involved as well. The indictment also alleged that Kenneth Pollack, a National Security Council staffer during the Clinton administration (and director of research at the Brookings Institution's Saban Center for Middle East Policy) provided information to former AIPAC employees Steve J. Rosen and Keith Weissman. This allegation was not part of any of the legal proceeding in this case. Pollack, and a senior State Department official, David Satterfield, were termed "unindicted co-conspirators."

Criminal charges

On May 3, 2005, the FBI filed criminal charges against Franklin. The complaint alleges that, at a June 26, 2003 lunch, Franklin disclosed classified national defense information related to potential attacks on U.S. forces in Iraq to two unnamed individuals. According to contemporary media reports, the two individuals were Steve J. Rosen and Keith Weissman, who were employed by AIPAC at the time. The complaint also alleged that Franklin disclosed classified information to "a foreign official and members of the media", and that a search of Franklin's home found approximately 83 classified documents.

Franklin appeared in court on May 4, 2005. He was released on $100,000 bond. Franklin's lawyer said he would plead not guilty.

On August 4, a federal grand jury indicted Franklin on five charges of violating the Espionage Act of 1917 :
One count of conspiracy to communicate national defense information to people not entitled to receive it. (18 USC 793 (d), (e) and (g))
Three counts of communicating national defense information to people not entitled to receive it. (18 USC 793)
One count of conspiring to communicate national defense information to an agent of a foreign government. (50 US 783, 18 USC 371)

After being confronted by the FBI in the spring of 2004, Franklin agreed to cooperate and to pass on fabricated information to selected information. He contacted several individuals, including Weissman, with whom he had not seen in over a year. In July 2004, in the Patisserie of the Pentagon City mall's Nordstroms, Franklin repeated the fabricated information orally to Weissman. Because one item concerned imminent assassination plots against Kurds, Iraqis, and Israelis, Weissman felt obligated to pass that information on to the governments whose citizens he told Weissman were targeted.

According to The Washington Post, "A lawyer familiar with the AIPAC case said administration officials 'want[ed] this case as a precedent so they can have it in their arsenal' and added: 'This as a weapon that can be turned against the media.'"

Guilty plea
On September 30, 2005, The Washington Post reported that Franklin was negotiating an agreement with prosecutors and would plead guilty to at least the conspiracy charges at a court hearing the following week, after which he would continue his cooperation with prosecutors.

He did indeed plead guilty to the three conspiracy counts on October 5, explaining that he had shared his frustrations over U.S. Iran policy with the other two defendants regularly in 2002 and later passed oral information to them he knew was classified in the hope they could get them to employees of the National Security Council who might be able to help force a harder line. He also asked Rosen for help getting him a job at the NSC; Rosen told him politely, "I'll see what I can do," claimed Franklin. Rosen never acted upon this request because Franklin eventually was charged with conspiracy counts.

He also passed other classified information along to an Israeli official concerning weapons testing and military activities in Iraq and other Middle Eastern Countries.Franklin stated that he knew some of the documents and oral information he passed along could be used to the detriment of U.S. national security interests. However, he never passed nor even showed any documents to Weissman or Rosen.

On January 20, 2006, Judge T.S. Ellis, III sentenced Franklin to 12 years and 7 months in prison and a $10,000 fine for passing classified information to a pro-Israel lobby group and an Israeli diplomat but Franklin was to remain free pending his cooperation with prosecutors in the cases against Rosen and Weissman.

In August, he denied Weissman and Rosen's motion to dismiss their indictment on the grounds that the government could still prosecute and punish those who retransmitted classified information orally regardless of whether they had a security clearance or not, an interpretation of the Espionage Act that could have wide-reaching implications if it were allowed to become legal precedent.

A significant problem for the government arose in a pre-trial ruling in August 2006, when veteran trial judge T.S. Ellis III ruled that line to mean that prosecutors had to show that U.S. interests were harmed, not just that Rosen and Weissman relayed secrets to a foreign power: Israel. Relaying secrets to friends of the United States, Ellis ruled, was not in and of itself criminal. For a crime to be committed, he wrote in his opinion, the accused must have sought both benefit to another nation as well as to harm the United States. Ellis' legal rulings set a high bar for the prosecutors, including a requirement to prove that Rosen and Weissman knowingly meant to harm the United States or aid another country.

In May 2009, federal prosecutors dropped the charges against Rosen and Weissman, citing that restrictions the judge had placed on the case made a conviction unlikely. Lawyers familiar with the case noted that the prosecutors' case had many other problems as well, most notably that Weissman and Rosen had a very strong defense.

On June 11, prosecutors asked Judge Ellis to reduce Franklin's sentence to eight years for his cooperation. Judge Ellis said the dropping of the case against Rosen and Weissman was a "significant" factor in the sentencing of Franklin and sentenced him to ten months house arrest along with 100 hours of community service. Ellis said Franklin's community service should consist of "speaking to young people about the importance of public officials obeying the law".

Franklin's account of events
In late 2009, Franklin wrote that his objective was "to halt the rush to war in Iraq—at least long enough to adopt a realistic policy toward an Iran bent on doing us ill", not "to leak secrets to a foreign government". However, the meetings with AIPAC officials in which the pertinent oral information was transmitted, which brought Franklin to the FBI's attention, occurred over three months after the 2003 invasion of Iraq Franklin confirmed that he never passed any documents to Weissman and Rosen, only oral information.

Accusations denied by AIPAC and Israel
The spying charges have been denied by Israel as well as AIPAC. The Israeli Embassy in Washington called the charges "completely false and outrageous" and AIPAC stated the allegations were "baseless and false."

On December 1, 2004, FBI agents raided the offices of AIPAC and seized computer equipment and files of Howard Kohr, the Executive Director, Richard Fishman, Managing Director, Renee Rothstein, Communication Director and Raphael Danziger. Research Director. According to an article published in The Washington Post eight days later, all were suspected of being cut-outs, agents who picked up information from Franklin and passed it on to Israel. The FBI did not bring charges against any of them.

There has been at least one case of Israeli espionage in the United States before the AIPAC scandal. Jonathan Pollard, an Israeli spy who worked in the Naval Antiterrorist Alert Center, pleaded guilty to espionage and was sentenced to life in prison in 1987. The incident had a significantly detrimental impact on U.S.–Israeli relations. Israeli officials have stated that the Israeli government terminated all espionage activities in the United States after the Pollard affair.

Some believe that Israel's credibility with regard to Franklin is tainted by their insistence in the Pollard case that he likewise was not a spy, a position they maintained for 13 years before admitting, in 1998, that Pollard indeed had been a spy for Israel. Others  think the damage that Israel sustained over the Pollard affair makes it unlikely that the country would again jeopardize its relationship with the United States through espionage, and note that the U.S. government has neither registered a protest with the Israelis nor accused its officials of wrongdoing in the AIPAC affair.

Pentagon statement: Franklin did not influence policy
According to a Pentagon statement, "the investigation involves a single individual at D.O.D. at the desk officer level, who was not in a position to have significant influence over U.S. policy."

Context for the investigation

Concern about uncontrolled military technology transfers
Journalist Jim Lobe suggests that the Franklin story is part of a larger investigation into transfer of sensitive military and dual-use technologies to Israel, including powerful case-management software. A concern is that Israeli companies have then re-sold sensitive U.S.-derived technology to potential U.S. strategic rivals such as Russia and China, and possibly on the black market where it can potentially be obtained by terrorist groups such as al-Qaeda.

Media reaction
The Los Angeles Times felt that the government was right to drop its espionage case against Rosen and Weissman, arguing that this was the first time that non-government employees were being prosecuted under the Espionage Act, which they argued was meant to prevent government employees from leaking classified information. The Times argued that prosecuting private civilians would set a president for prosecuting journalists and others who publish leaked information, which "sounds more like Britain's Official Secrets Act than an American law consonant with the 1st Amendment", pointing out that "when Congress passed the Espionage Act, it explicitly rejected a version that would have punished newspapers for printing information "useful to the enemy"."

Rosen interview
In a television interview broadcast in Israel, Rosen said, "What it would have shown is that I did nothing wrong," he said. "Who did something wrong is the people who brought this case, not just that they were incorrect, but that the attitude they had about Jews, Israel, AIPAC, was completely false, and unfortunately, a lot of that nonsense is still out there.

"They knew very well that I spoke to the Embassy of Israel, it was no great surprise to them, they also spoke to the embassy," he said. "We would have a triangle, three-way conversation. It was nothing special. It was normal. But these people were talking as if we were a nest of spies, that we were doing something against America."

In the interview at his home, Rosen charged that Lawrence Franklin was railroaded into pleading guilty, by threats to harm his family by cutting off his pension. He said federal prosecutors used the same type of tactics against him.

"They wanted to destroy me. They forced AIPAC to fire me. They forced AIPAC to cut off my attorneys' fees," he said. "They tried to isolate me, to put me in a situation of desperation where I would have to plead guilty to something I did not do. This happens all the time."

See also
 Jonathan Pollard

References

External links
 Letting go of the AIPAC case Los Angeles Times editorial, May 7, 2009

George W. Bush administration controversies
Israel–United States relations
Iran–United States relations
American Israel Public Affairs Committee
Foreign relations of the United States
Espionage scandals and incidents
2004 in international relations
Franklin, Lawrence